Jean-Pierre Montcassen is a pen name of Imre Cselenyák (Nyírkáta, Hungary, 1 January 1957.) a story teller (in his own words), novelist, musician, song lyricist, the vice president of the Hungarian Prose Writer Workshop, and a member of the Hungarian Literary Authors' Collecting Society (HLACS) ("MISZJE").

His activities 
After he graduated from high school, he worked as a workman, mainly in the pharmaceutical industry. 
He educated himself musically, he completed a performers' licence exam at the state office ORI in the 80's, he was a member of the ensembles Vulkán, Hipnózis, Kontinens as composer-songwriter-singer. He is a member for life of the band Írottkő Műhely ("Written Stone Workshop"). He has achieved his biggest successes with the ensemble Kontinens. Radio and television recording were made with him, he performed in many legendary places: Metró klub ("Metro Club"), Budai Ifjúsági Park ("Youth Park of Buda"), Petőfi csarnok ("Petőfi Hall"), etc.

In 1989, he finished a course in journalism, since then he has been writing short stories, novels. His short prose has been published in Hungarian by literary journals C. E. T., Polisz, Új Holnap,  Magyar Napló, Debreceni Disputa. His writings can also be read in the columns of the dailies 24 ÓRA, Kelet Magyarország, and others, as well as the magazines Gyöngy, and Anna.
He is a member of the Writers' Association. In Budapest, in Dorog, throughout the country, as well as over the border (Upper Hungary, Transylvania), he has been organizing literary evenings, has been participating in writer-reader meetings. In the Club of the Writers' Association, along with writer Ferenc Gáspár, he has introduced authors and editors as part of the programs of the Prózaműhely ("Prose Workshop"). He lives in Dorog, his wife is Rita Cservenka, journalist, cultural organizer, his grown-up sons are Balázs (1989), and Tibor (1990).

His novels under the name Jean-Pierre Montcassen 
(English work titles are given in parentheses.)
 A halál vámszedője (2000, Puedlo )
("The Publican of Death")
 Tajgerosz kegyeltje (2001, Puedlo )
("Taigeros' Favorite ")
 A legionárius (2002, Puedlo )
("The Legionary")
 Azálea (2003, Puedlo )
("Azalea")
 A fáraó lánya (2004, Puedlo )
("The Pharaoh's Daughter")
 Az egyiptomi kéjnő (2006, Puedlo )
("The Egyptian Harlot")
 A magyarok nyilaitól... (2008, Puedlo )
("From the Arrows of Hungarians...")
 Attila, Isten ostora (2008, Puedlo )
("Attila, the Scourge of God")
 A sivatag hercegnője (2009, Puedlo )
("The Princess of the Desert")
 Az egyiptomi kéjnő (2009, Puedlo, second edition )
("The Egyptian Harlot")
 A fáraó lánya (2010, Puedlo, second edition )
("The Pharaoh's Daughter")
 A sivatag hercegnője (2010, Puedlo, second edition )
("The Princess of the Desert")
 Az egyiptomi kéjnő (2010, Puedlo, third edition )
("The Egyptian Harlot")
 Szamuráj és gésa (2010, Puedlo)
("Samurai and Geisha")
 A legionárius szerelme (2011, Zen)
("The Legionary's Love" – same as The Legionary, with revised title )

References

External links 
 Note: Some or all of these references only have a Hungarian version, and have not yet been translated into any other languages.
 Imre Cselenyák's website
 A biographical self-introduction of Imre Cselenyák on the Coldwell Publishing website
 Kontinens a Rocközön után – Hírextra
 Imre Cselenyák's works on "Könyvkolónia" ("Book colony") the book-community website of Libri, an online bookseller (Hungary) Cselenyák Imre művei a Könyvkolónia oldalán
 The official website of the Town of Dorog, Hungary in English (also in Hungarian and German) dorog.hu 
 konyvtaram.hu
 A  '24 óra' (24 Hours), the Komárom-Esztergom County, Hungary daily newspaper article about  Jean-Pierre Montcassen breaking a selling record
  Cselenyák Imre, Rauscher Prize winner in Dorog, Hungary
 Spanyolnátha An interview with Imre Cselenyák in Hungarian

 

1957 births
Living people
Hungarian male novelists
21st-century Hungarian novelists
21st-century Hungarian male writers